Zadvarje is a village and a municipality in the Split-Dalmatia County, Croatia. It has a population of 289 (2011 census), 99.3% of which are Croats. The only settlement in Zadvarje municipality is Zadvarje itself.

References

Populated places in Split-Dalmatia County
Municipalities of Croatia